Ermin Cavcic (born 22 October 2002) is a Dutch professional footballer who plays as a defender for MVV Maastricht. Born in Maastricht, Cavcic is of Bosnian descent.

Career statistics

Club

Notes

References

2002 births
Living people
Dutch footballers
Association football defenders
MVV Maastricht players
Eerste Divisie players
Dutch people of Bosnia and Herzegovina descent
Footballers from Maastricht